Vaqif Sadıqov (born 2 November 1956) is an Azerbaijani diplomat currently serving as Azerbaijan's Ambassador to Belgium and the European Union.

Background and education 
Vaqif Sadıqov was born in Baku, Azerbaijan. He is married with two children. Vaqif Sadıqov was educated at the Azerbaijani Institute of Foreign Languages and obtained a master's degree in linguistics in 1978 and PhD degree in linguistics in 1986.

Career 

After completing his PhD degree, Vaqif Sadıqov was appointed an assistant professor in the Azerbaijani Institute of Foreign Languages, where he served until 1991. He joined the Ministry of Foreign Affairs in 1992 and became the head of the political-military affairs division from 1993 to 1995 when he was appointed Azerbaijan's Ambassador to Austria, and Permanent Representative to the United Nations Office at Vienna, UNIDO, and OSCE. He served as Permanent Representative to the Comprehensive Nuclear-Test-Ban Treaty Organization from 1998 to 2004, and to the International Atomic Energy Agency from 2001 to 2004. He participated in the negotiations on the adapted CFE Treaty and development of new CSBMs, the OSCE Charter for European Security, and the UN Conventions against Transnational Organized Crime and against Corruption.

Vaqif Sadıqov was appointed Deputy Foreign Minister in 2004 with a portfolio covering Azerbaijan's relations with the UNESCO and the Organization of the Islamic Conference. ln  2010, he was appointed Azerbaijan's Ambassador to Italy and served simultaneously as Permanent Representative to the United Nations Food and Agriculture Organization, World Food Programme, International Fund for Agricultural Development based in Rome. He was also accredited as Ambassador to Malta and San Marino. In 2016 - 2021, he served as Permanent Representative to the United Nations Office at Geneva. In that period, he participated in many UN conferences and events on human rights, migration, labour issues, humanitarian law, development. During that period, Vaqif Sadıqov was elected ILO Government Group chairperson, UNCTAD Trade and Development Board vice-president, and chairman of UNECE 2020 Regional Forum on Sustainable Development. Since 2019 when Azerbaijan assumed the chairmanship in the Non-Aligned Movement, Vaqif Sadıqov became a chairman of the NAM's Geneva Chapter. Since 2021, Vaqif Sadıqov is Azerbaijan's Ambassador to Belgium, and also to Luxembourg, and Head of the Mission to the European Union. .

References 

1956 births
Living people
Azerbaijani Muslims
Diplomats from Baku
Azerbaijani diplomats
Azerbaijan University of Languages alumni
Permanent Representatives of Azerbaijan to the United Nations
Permanent Representatives to the United Nations in Vienna
Ambassadors of Azerbaijan to Austria
Ambassadors of Azerbaijan to Italy
Ambassadors of Azerbaijan to Malta
Ambassadors of Azerbaijan to San Marino
Ambassadors of Azerbaijan to Belgium